The following lists the top 25 singles of 2013  in Australia from the Australian Recording Industry Association (ARIA) end-of-year singles chart.

Katy Perry had the highest selling single in Australia in 2013 with "Roar".

See also
List of number-one singles of 2013 (Australia)
List of Top 25 albums for 2013 in Australia

References

Australian record charts
2013 in Australian music
Australia Top 25 Singles